The All-Big Ten Conference football team is an annual Big Ten Conference honor bestowed on the best players in the conference following every college football season.

Seasons
Following is a list of all-conference teams in the history of the Big Ten:

 1914 All-Western Conference football team
 1916 All-Western Conference football team
 1917 All-Big Ten Conference football team
 1918 All-Big Ten Conference football team
 1919 All-Big Ten Conference football team
 1920 All-Big Ten Conference football team
 1921 All-Big Ten Conference football team
 1922 All-Big Ten Conference football team
 1923 All-Big Ten Conference football team
 1924 All-Big Ten Conference football team
 1925 All-Big Ten Conference football team
 1926 All-Big Ten Conference football team
 1927 All-Big Ten Conference football team
 1928 All-Big Ten Conference football team
 1929 All-Big Ten Conference football team
 1930 All-Big Ten Conference football team
 1931 All-Big Ten Conference football team
 1932 All-Big Ten Conference football team
 1933 All-Big Ten Conference football team
 1934 All-Big Ten Conference football team
 1935 All-Big Ten Conference football team
 1936 All-Big Ten Conference football team
 1937 All-Big Ten Conference football team
 1938 All-Big Ten Conference football team
 1939 All-Big Ten Conference football team
 1940 All-Big Ten Conference football team
 1941 All-Big Ten Conference football team
 1942 All-Big Ten Conference football team
 1943 All-Big Ten Conference football team
 1944 All-Big Ten Conference football team
 1945 All-Big Ten Conference football team
 1946 All-Big Nine Conference football team
 1947 All-Big Nine Conference football team
 1948 All-Big Nine Conference football team
 1949 All-Big Nine Conference football team
 1950 All-Big Ten Conference football team
 1951 All-Big Ten Conference football team
 1952 All-Big Ten Conference football team
 1953 All-Big Ten Conference football team
 1954 All-Big Ten Conference football team
 1955 All-Big Ten Conference football team
 1956 All-Big Ten Conference football team
 1957 All-Big Ten Conference football team
 1958 All-Big Ten Conference football team
 1959 All-Big Ten Conference football team
 1960 All-Big Ten Conference football team
 1961 All-Big Ten Conference football team
 1962 All-Big Ten Conference football team
 1963 All-Big Ten Conference football team
 1964 All-Big Ten Conference football team
 1965 All-Big Ten Conference football team
 1966 All-Big Ten Conference football team
 1967 All-Big Ten Conference football team
 1968 All-Big Ten Conference football team
 1969 All-Big Ten Conference football team
 1970 All-Big Ten Conference football team
 1971 All-Big Ten Conference football team
 1972 All-Big Ten Conference football team
 1973 All-Big Ten Conference football team
 1974 All-Big Ten Conference football team
 1975 All-Big Ten Conference football team
 1976 All-Big Ten Conference football team
 1977 All-Big Ten Conference football team
 1978 All-Big Ten Conference football team
 1979 All-Big Ten Conference football team
 1980 All-Big Ten Conference football team
 1981 All-Big Ten Conference football team
 1982 All-Big Ten Conference football team
 1983 All-Big Ten Conference football team
 1984 All-Big Ten Conference football team
 1985 All-Big Ten Conference football team
 1986 All-Big Ten Conference football team
 1987 All-Big Ten Conference football team
 1988 All-Big Ten Conference football team
 1989 All-Big Ten Conference football team
 1990 All-Big Ten Conference football team
 1991 All-Big Ten Conference football team
 1992 All-Big Ten Conference football team
 1993 All-Big Ten Conference football team
 1994 All-Big Ten Conference football team
 1995 All-Big Ten Conference football team
 1996 All-Big Ten Conference football team
 1997 All-Big Ten Conference football team
 1998 All-Big Ten Conference football team
 1999 All-Big Ten Conference football team
 2000 All-Big Ten Conference football team
 2001 All-Big Ten Conference football team
 2002 All-Big Ten Conference football team
 2003 All-Big Ten Conference football team
 2004 All-Big Ten Conference football team
 2005 All-Big Ten Conference football team
 2006 All-Big Ten Conference football team
 2007 All-Big Ten Conference football team
 2008 All-Big Ten Conference football team
 2009 All-Big Ten Conference football team
 2010 All-Big Ten Conference football team
 2011 All-Big Ten Conference football team
 2012 All-Big Ten Conference football team
 2013 All-Big Ten Conference football team
 2014 All-Big Ten Conference football team
 2015 All-Big Ten Conference football team
 2016 All-Big Ten Conference football team
 2017 All-Big Ten Conference football team
 2018 All-Big Ten Conference football team
 2019 All-Big Ten Conference football team
 2020 All-Big Ten Conference football team
 2021 All-Big Ten Conference football team
 2022 All-Big Ten Conference football team

References